Justine Henin-Hardenne was the defending champion and successfully defended her title, by defeating Svetlana Kuznetsova 7–6(7–3), 6–3 in the final.

Seeds
The first four seeds received a bye into the second round.

Draw

Finals

Top half

Bottom half

External links
 Official results archive (ITF)
 Official results archive (WTA)

2004 Dubai Tennis Championships
Singles